Route 111 is a north/south highway on the north shore of the Saint-Lawrence River in the Abitibi-Témiscamingue region of Quebec, Canada. Its northern terminus is in the municipality of Baie-James at the junction of Route 393, and its southern terminus is in Val-d'Or at the junction of Route 117.

Municipalities along Route 111

 Val-d'Or
 La Corne
 Saint-Marc-de-Figuery
 Amos
 Trécesson
 Launay
 Taschereau
 Authier
 Macamic
 La Sarre
 Dupuy
 Normétal
 Baie-James

Major intersections

See also
 List of Quebec provincial highways

References

External links  
 Official Transport Quebec Road Map (Courtesy of the Quebec Ministry of Transportation) 
 Route 111 on Google Maps

111
Roads in Abitibi-Témiscamingue
Amos, Quebec
Val-d'Or